Terrie is a given name. Notable people with this name include the following:

Terrie Hall (1960–2013), American anti-smoking and anti-tobacco advocate
Terrie Huntington, American politician
Terrie Miller (born 1978), American-born Norwegian swimmer
Terrie Moffitt (born 1955), German-born American clinical psychologist
Terrie Pickerill, American political strategist 
Terrie Suit (born 1964), French-born American politician
Terrie Sultan (born 1952), American art historian and museum director
Terrie John Trosper (1969–1991), Satanic panic victim
Terrie Waddell, Australian actress
Terrie Williams (born 1954), American writer
Terrie Wood, American politician

See also

Terie Norelli
Terre
Terri
Terria (disambiguation)
Terrier (disambiguation)
Terrine (disambiguation)